Patrick Joseph Connolly (born 27 July 1941) is an English former footballer who played in the Football League as a forward for Crewe Alexandra and Colchester United.

Career

Connolly, born in Newcastle-under-Lyme, joined Crewe Alexandra in 1960, making nine appearances and scoring three goals in his time with the club. He moved into non-league football with Macclesfield Town before signing for Colchester United for £1,200 in 1964.

During the 1964–65 season, Connolly made 21 appearances, scoring seven goals. He made his debut on 22 August in a 1–0 defeat at Layer Road to Carlisle United and scored his first goal on 26 October in a 1–1 home draw with Workington. His last goal for the club came on 20 March 1965 in a 3–1 Essex derby win over Southend United, and made his last appearance on 16 April in a 1–0 defeat to Peterborough United.

Connolly later played for non-league teams Altrincham, Northwich Victoria and Winsford United after his Colchester exit in the summer of 1965.

References

1941 births
Living people
Sportspeople from Newcastle-under-Lyme
English footballers
Association football forwards
Crewe Alexandra F.C. players
Macclesfield Town F.C. players
Colchester United F.C. players
Altrincham F.C. players
Northwich Victoria F.C. players
Winsford United F.C. players
English Football League players